Avraam Xanthopoulos (born 29 September 1972) is a retired Greek football defender.

References

1972 births
Living people
Greek footballers
Doxa Drama F.C. players
Iraklis Thessaloniki F.C. players
Ethnikos Asteras F.C. players
Apollon Pontou FC players
Association football defenders
Super League Greece players